Postal Services Act may refer to:

Malaysia
Postal Services Act 1991 (Act 465), an Act of Parliament in Malaysia
Postal Services (Successor Company) Act 1991 (Act 466), an Act of Parliament in Malaysia
Postal Services Act 2012 (Act 741), provides for the licensing of postal services and the regulation of the postal services industry

United Kingdom
Postal Services Act 2000, established an industry regulator, a consumer watchdog, and required a "universal service" of post to be provided
Postal Services Act 2011, enabled the British Government to sell shares in Royal Mail to private investors

See also
Postal Act (disambiguation)